César Augusto Belli Michelon (born 16 November 1975 in Bebedouro) is a Brazilian former footballer who played as a defender.

Honours

Club
Corinthians
São Paulo State League: 2003

International
Brazil
Copa América: 1999

External links
 sambafoot
 CBF

1975 births
Living people
People from Bebedouro
Brazilian footballers
Brazilian expatriate footballers
Brazil under-20 international footballers
Brazil international footballers
1998 CONCACAF Gold Cup players
1999 Copa América players
1999 FIFA Confederations Cup players
2001 FIFA Confederations Cup players
Association football defenders
Associação Atlética Ponte Preta players
Associação Portuguesa de Desportos players
Paris Saint-Germain F.C. players
Stade Rennais F.C. players
Expatriate footballers in France
Ligue 1 players
Sociedade Esportiva Palmeiras players
CD Tenerife players
Club Athletico Paranaense players
Sport Club Corinthians Paulista players
Fortaleza Esporte Clube players
Mirassol Futebol Clube players
Campeonato Brasileiro Série A players
Expatriate footballers in Spain
Copa América-winning players
Footballers from São Paulo (state)